The Mississauga IceDogs were a junior ice hockey team in Mississauga, Ontario, Canada. They played in the Ontario Hockey League from 1998 to 2007. A sale relocated the team to St. Catharines, Ontario for the 2007–08 season and they are now called the Niagara IceDogs.

History
From 1998 to 2002, the IceDogs enjoyed little success, finishing last in the OHL's Central Division every year. During this building phase, the team had six head coaches within the span of 4 years, including the owner, Don Cherry. Mississauga drafted first overall each year, leading to two rookies of the year, including one of the highest touted NHL prospects in Jason Spezza.

In the 2002–03 season, the IceDogs finished fourth in the Central Division and made the playoffs for the first time in franchise history, but lost in the first round in five games against the Ottawa 67's.

2003–04 was the IceDogs' best season. The team finished second in the Central Division, two points behind the division champion Toronto St. Michael's Majors, and third overall in the Eastern Conference.

In the first round of the playoffs, the IceDogs defeated the Oshawa Generals in seven games, winning their first-ever playoff series. The IceDogs were down three games to two against the Barrie Colts in the second round but managed to come back and win the series in seven games. The surprise IceDogs then upset the St. Michael's Majors in the Eastern Conference Championship series in six games to win the Bobby Orr Trophy and earn their first-ever trip to the Ontario Hockey League finals. The dream ended there as they fell to the Guelph Storm in four straight games in the OHL final, losing the fourth game at the Hershey Centre.

The 2004–05 season was another record setting season for the IceDogs. They won their first ever Central Division title and finished first in the Eastern Conference with 81 points. Despite regular season success, the IceDogs were upset in the first round of the playoffs by the eighth-seeded St. Michael's Majors in five games. In 2005–06, the IceDogs started rebuilding and missed the playoffs again.

Change in ownership
On July 12, 2006, Eugene Melnyk, owner of the Toronto St. Michael's Majors and the NHL's Ottawa Senators, bought the Mississauga IceDogs. After the 2006–07 season, Melnyk sold the IceDogs, and moved the Majors to the Hershey Centre in Mississauga. On January 8, 2007, Toronto businessman Tom Bitove proposed to buy the team with plans to move to Niagara Falls, but city council declined the proposal to build a new arena.  As an alternative, the team approached the City of St. Catharines about moving the team into Jack Gatecliff Arena in the downtown core. St. Catharines City Council voted on a leasing arrangement on April 23, 2007, which passed. Bill Burke bought the IceDogs and relocated the team to St. Catharines in time for the 2007–08 season, to be known as the Niagara IceDogs. The IceDogs played their final game in Mississauga on April 1, 2007, losing in game 5 of the Eastern Conference quarterfinals at home to the Sudbury Wolves.

Championships

Bobby Orr TrophyEastern Conference Champions
 2004 playoffs

Emms TrophyCentral Division Champions
 2004–05 regular season

Coaches
Former team owner and hockey commentator Donald S. Cherry stepped behind the bench to coach the IceDogs for the 2001–02 season, after going through five coaches in three years. The team had its best season to the date, but still failed to reach the playoffs. The IceDogs were one of the highest-selling road teams in the OHL that year, as many spectators attended games to see Don Cherry coach and seek autographs.

Players
The Mississauga IceDogs had the first overall draft pick four years in a row, which produced two rookies of the year, and a total of ten alumni have played in the National Hockey League.

Award winners

CHL Rookie of the Year
 2001–02 Patrick O'Sullivan

Emms Family AwardOHL Rookie of the Year
 2001–02 Patrick O'Sullivan
 2002–03 Rob Schremp

Jack Ferguson AwardFirst Overall Draft Pick
 1999 Jason Spezza
 2000 Patrick Jarrett
 2001 Patrick O'Sullivan
 2002 Rob Schremp

OHL Goaltender of the Year
 2004–05 Michael Ouzas

NHL alumni

Season-by-season results

Regular season
Legend: OTL = Overtime loss, SL = Shootout loss

Playoffs1998–99 Out of playoffs.1999–2000 Out of playoffs.2000–01 Out of playoffs.2001–02 Out of playoffs.2002–03 Lost to Ottawa 67's 4 games to 1 in conference quarter-finals.2003–04 Defeated Oshawa Generals 4 games to 3 in conference quarter-finals. Defeated Barrie Colts 4 games to 3 in conference semi-finals. Defeated St. Michael's Majors 4 games to 2 in conference finals. Lost to Guelph Storm 4 games to 0 in finals.2004–05 Lost to St. Michael's Majors 4 games to 1 in conference quarter-finals.2005–06 Out of playoffs.2006–07 Lost to Sudbury Wolves 4 games to 1 in conference quarter-finals.

Uniforms and logos

The IceDogs' colours are red, white, black and silver. The logo is styled after Don Cherry's pet bull terrier named Blue. It shows a snarling dog overtop of the IceDogs name with a maple leaf in the background. The original logo (inset right) looked like a roboticized dog with red eyes in front of a big letter "M" with a maple leaf in the corner. The logo was redesigned after their 5th season with the change in ownership.

Arena
The Mississauga IceDogs played their home games at the Hershey Centre in northeast Mississauga, near the junction of Highways 401, 403 and 410. The Hershey Centre hosted the OHL All-Star Game in 2000.Capacity = 5,420Ice Size''' = 200' x 85'
Hershey Centre - The OHL Arena & Travel Guide

See also
List of ice hockey teams in Ontario

References

External links
Ontario Hockey League
Canadian Hockey League

Defunct Ontario Hockey League teams
Sport in Mississauga
Ice hockey clubs established in 1997
Ice hockey clubs disestablished in 2007
1997 establishments in Ontario
2007 disestablishments in Ontario

fr:IceDogs de Mississauga